Saint Augustine's Catholic High School and Sixth Form is a Catholic High School in Hunt End in the town of Redditch, Worcestershire, England.  The school was opened in 1974. The school converted to academy status on 1 July 2014.

The school is part of the three tier system, serving as the High School stage, teaching children from the ages of 13–18 (Yr9 to Yr13). In 2019, 77% of the Yr11 students achieved 5 or more standard passes at GCSE, including Mathematics and English.  88% of students achieved a standard pass in English (grade 4) whilst 75% achieved a strong pass (grade 5).  81% of students gained a standard pass in Mathematics (grade 4) and 64% a strong pass (grade 5).  Students achieved 100%, 9-4 grades in the subjects of Biology, Chemistry, Physics and Polish.  96% of Sixth Form students gained 3 or more A levels.  From a cohort of 104 students, 61 A*/A grades or equivalent were gained.  
A May 2017 Ofsted Inspection rated the school as outstanding.
A March 2019 Section 48 Inspection by the Archdiocese of Birmingham, graded the school as outstanding in all three categories of Catholic Life, Religious Education and Collective Worship.

The school has a Maths Block named 'The Canterbury Suite'. The opening was attended by the Jacqui Smith, the former MP for Redditch and former Home Secretary.

St. Augustine's is the oldest continuously operating High School in Redditch, and the name has remained unchanged since it was opened in September 1974.

Feeder schools
The majority of students come from St. Bede's Catholic Middle School in the Lodge Park area of Redditch. St. Bede's is the only Catholic Middle School in Redditch. Students also come from Walkwood Middle School and Ridgeway Middle School.

Notable former pupils
 Missy Goodwin, footballer
 Alex Kennedy, soldier
 Jack Montgomery, actor

References

External links
 School website

Upper schools in Worcestershire
Redditch
Educational institutions established in 1974
1974 establishments in England
Catholic secondary schools in the Archdiocese of Birmingham
Academies in Worcestershire